Dimitri Atanasov (born 8 August 1927) is a Bulgarian alpine skier. He competed in the men's slalom at the 1952 Winter Olympics.

References

1927 births
Living people
Bulgarian male alpine skiers
Olympic alpine skiers of Bulgaria
Alpine skiers at the 1952 Winter Olympics
Place of birth missing (living people)